Statistics of Primera Fuerza in season 1942-43.

Overview
It was contested by 8 teams, and Marte won the championship.

League standings

Results

Information
  This is the last Liga Mexicana de Football Amateur tournament held in México, having Club Deportivo Marte as the last historic champion 
  After this season 10 teams began a professional football league system called  Liga Mayor de Fútbol de México, today known as Liga MX. 
  The real great team, with 14 championships, in Liga Mexicana de Football Amateur era is Real Club España. 
  The championships won at the Liga Mexicana de Football Amateur are not accumulative for professional championships at the  Liga MX

Moves

After this season Necaxa and Selección Jalisco retired, while Albinegros de Orizaba, Atlas, Guadalajara, and Veracruz joined.

Top goalscorers
Players sorted first by goals scored, then by last name.

References
Mexico - List of final tables (RSSSF)

1942-43
Mex
1942–43 in Mexican football